National Highway 458, commonly referred to as NH 458 is a national highway in  India. It is a spur road of National Highway 58. NH-458 traverses the state of Rajasthan in India.

Route 
Ladnu -nimbi-Sherani-Khatu - Degana - Merta - Lambia - Jaitran - Raipur - Bheem.

Junctions  
 
 Terminal with National Highway 58 near Ladnun.
 Terminal with National Highway 58 near Bheem.

See also 
List of National Highways in India by highway number
List of National Highways in India by state

References

External links 

 NH 458 on OpenStreetMap

National highways in India
National Highways in Rajasthan